The Total Request Live Tour (also known as MTV's TRL Tour) was a co-headlining tour featuring American groups, 3LW, Destiny's Child, Dream, St. Lunatics and American artists Eve and Nelly. Jessica Simpson joined the tour for select dates before venturing off to her own solo tour. Her slot was later taken by City High.

The tour ran during the summer of 2001, playing over 30 shows in the United States and Canada. Many dates were cancelled as an outcome of the 9/11 attacks. This was the first and only edition of the tour.

Background
MTV first positioned a concert series, featuring various acts performing in major markets throughout the U.S.. The idea was to take big names popular on the network and up and coming acts exposure to an arena-sized audience. In 1999, TLC, Backstreet Boys, Britney Spears were rumored to perform together on an MTV-sponsored tour. However, these plans were never confirmed or denied by MTV.

Destiny's Child served as the headlining act. Newcomers 3LW and Dream were featured alongside Jessica Simpson, Eve and Nelly with the St. Lunatics. Simpson's final show was on August 4, 2001. City High was brought in as a replacement on August 9, 2001.

The show followed the TRL format, and featured Solange Knowles as the host and emcee. TRL host Carson Daly was also featured via video screens to introduce the show. In-between acts, music videos and paid advertisements would play on the video screens.

The tour initially was set for nearly 50 shows in the U.S. and Canada. After the 9/11 attacks, several dates were cancelled as a response to security risks for flying. Thus, the last show of the tour was in Denver, Colorado. A special show was planned to honor the victims of the 9/11 attacks,  and one of the cancelled shows in Honolulu was reversed. The special show featured Forté and DisGuyz as opening acts and Destiny's Child as the sole headliner.

Due to strong sales, it was believed the tour would formulate into an annual event. A 2002 tour was penciled yet cancelled before any plans were made.

Opening acts
3Gs 
Lil J 
Forté 
DisGuyz

Lineup
3LW
Dream
Jessica Simpson 
City High 
Eve
Nelly and the St. Lunatics
Destiny's Child

Set lists
The following set lists are obtained from the July 18, 2001 concert at the Pepsi Arena in Albany, New York. It does not represent all concerts throughout the tour. 
3LW
"Warning" 
"Playas Gon' Play"
"No More (Baby I'ma Do Right)"
Dream
"This Is Me" 
"He Loves U Not"
Jessica Simpson 
"Hot Like Fire"
"I Think I'm in Love with You"
"I Never"
"I Wanna Love You Forever"
"A Little Bit"
"Irresistible"
City High
"City High Anthem"
"What Would You Do?"
"Caramel"
Eve
"What Y'all Want"
"Love is Blind"
"Let Me Blow Ya Mind"
"Who's That Girl?"
Nelly and the St. Lunatics
"Video Introduction"
"Country Grammar (Hot Shit)"
"Batter Up"
"Midwest Swing"
"Ride wit Me"
"E.I."
Destiny's Child
"Independent Women Part I"
"No, No, No (Part 2)"
"Bug a Boo"
"Bills, Bills, Bills"
"Emotion"
"The Story of Beauty" 
"O-o-h Child" 
"Dangerously in Love" 
"Thank You, Lord" / "You've Been So Good" / "Jesus Loves Me" / "Total Praise"
"Bootylicious"
"Say My Name"
"Nasty Girl"
"Proud Mary"
"Jumpin', Jumpin'"
"Survivor"
"Happy Face"

Tour dates

Cancellations and rescheduled shows

Box office score data

References

2001 concert tours
MTV original programming